Sailfin moonfishes are a small family, Veliferidae, of lampriform fishes found in the Indian and western Pacific Oceans. Unlike other lampriforms, they live in shallow, coastal waters, of less than  depth, rather than in the deep ocean. They are characterised by their ability to retract the anterior rays of their dorsal and anal fins into a sheath.

Species 
The two extant species in two genera are:
 Genus Metavelifer Walters, 1960
 Metavelifer multiradiatus (Regan, 1907)
 Genus Velifer Temminck and Schlegel, 1850
 Velifer hypselopterus Bleeker, 1879

Fossil record
 Nardovelifer, from the Campanian of Italy.
 Oechsleria unterfeldensis, from the lower Oligocene of the Bodenheim Formation, Germany.
 Veronavelifer, from the Eocene of Italy.
 Wettonius angeloi, from the Eocene of Italy.

References
 

 
Animal families